Ryan Kane (born 26 November 1991 in Glasgow) is a Scottish footballer who plays for Clyde in the Scottish Third Division. He began his career with Scottish First Division side Greenock Morton.

He went on loan to Glenafton Athletic in 2010, with Nathan Shepherd.

Career

Kane made his début for Greenock Morton  against Inverness Caledonian Thistle on 31 October 2009.

Kane, along with fellow youngster Nathan Shepherd was given a years extension in July 2010. In October, the pair signed for Glenafton Athletic on loan.

After his release from Morton, Kane impressed as a trialist for Clyde in four pre-season friendly matches, and signed for the club in July 2011. His first season with Clyde started with a 1–0 win against Montrose at Broadwood.

External links

See also
Greenock Morton F.C. season 2009-10 | 2010-11

References

1991 births
Footballers from Glasgow
Scottish footballers
Association football midfielders
Greenock Morton F.C. players
Clyde F.C. players
Scottish Football League players
Living people
Scottish Junior Football Association players
Glenafton Athletic F.C. players